The African Museum of Lyon (French: Musée Africain de Lyon) is the oldest museum in France dedicated to Africa, and one of the oldest museums in Lyon. The collections specialise in West African objects.The museum was created in 1861 by the Society of African Missions under the influence of Melchior de Marion Brésillac. After his death, Augustin Planque took over his role and asked the missionaries of the Society to send to France items reflecting the everyday, social and religious life of Africa. In 1998, the museum began the refurbishment and restoration of its building, which was formally reopened on 28 January 2001.

The museum is situated at 150, Cours Gambetta, Lyon. The building now provides 750m² for the display of the permanent collection, comprising 2,126 African objects. Exhibits are divided into three categories: Everyday Life, Social Life, and Religious Life. There is also a room reserved for temporary exhibitions.

See also
Society of African Missions

External links 
Musée Africain de Lyon official website 

Museums established in 1861
7th arrondissement of Lyon
Museums in Lyon
Anthropology museums in France
Art museums and galleries in France
African art museums
1861 establishments in France
Society of African Missions